The 2004 Dartmouth Big Green football team was an American football team that represented Dartmouth College during the 2004 NCAA Division I-AA football season. The Big Green tied for last in the Ivy League.

In its 13th and final season under head coach John Lyons, the team compiled a 1–9 record and was outscored 205 to 108. Ryan Conger, Chris Dodds, Chris Little and Clayton Smith were the team captains.

The Big Green's 1–6 conference record tied for sixth in the Ivy League standings. Dartmouth was outscored 200 to 151 by Ivy opponents. 

Dartmouth played its home games at Memorial Field on the college campus in Hanover, New Hampshire.

Schedule

References

Dartmouth
Dartmouth Big Green football seasons
Dartmouth Football